The 2007 FIA GT Zhuhai 2 Hours was the opening race of the 2007 FIA GT Championship season.  It took place on March 25, 2007.  Over 22,000 paying spectators plus another 1,000 VIPs attended the race in person.

This raced marked the first time Lamborghini scored an overall victory in an international racing series, with the All-Inkl.com Racing Lamborghini Murciélago R-GT taking the win.

Official results
Class winners in bold.  Cars failing to complete 75% of winner's distance marked as Not Classified (NC).

† – Michael Bartels was excluded from the results for driving less than 35 minutes.

‡ – #97 BMS Scuderia Italia was excluded from the results for failing post-race inspection due to a lower than legal ride height.

Statistics
 Pole Position – #1 Vitaphone Racing Team – 1:31.339
 Average Speed – 147.92 km/h

External links
 Official FIA GT website – Race Results

Z
6 Hours of Zhuhai
2007 in Chinese motorsport